Total System Services, Inc. (commonly referred to as TSYS), is an American financial technology company headquartered in Columbus, Georgia. In 2019, TSYS was merged into Global Payments Inc. TSYS is the largest third-party payment processor for issuing banks in North America, with a 40% market share, and one of the largest in Europe. It provides payment processing services, merchant services and related payment services. It also provides reloadable prepaid debit cards and payroll cards, and demand deposit accounts to the underbanked.

History
In 1959, TSYS was founded as a division of Columbus Bank and Trust (now Synovus). In 1974, it began processing credit cards for other banks. In August 1983, the company became a public company via an initial public offering.

In 1995, the company merged its merchant processing services with those of Visa Inc. In August 2004, the company acquired Clarity Payment Solutions for $53 million. In 2007, Synovus completed the corporate spin-off of TSYS. In July 2004, the company began processing the credit cards issued by J.P. Morgan Chase. In 2008, the company launched n>genuity, a quarterly publication on the world of payments.

In 2010, the company acquired a 51% stake in the merchant acquisition business of First National Bank of Omaha for $150.5 million, which was renamed TSYS Merchant Solutions. The remaining 49% stake was acquired in January 2011. In May 2011, the company acquired TermNet. In August 2012, the company announced a joint venture with Central Payment Co. LLC, a direct merchant acquirer. In December 2012, the company acquired ProPay, a Utah-based company with over 250,000 merchants.

In July 2013, the company acquired Netspend, a prepaid debit card provider, for $1.4 billion. In November 2013, the company announced TSYS Merchant Insights, a partnership with Womply, a San Francisco-based startup, to provide revenue, social media, and reputation analysis tools to all TSYS merchants.

In June 2014, CEO Philip W. Tomlinson retired and was replaced with M. Troy Woods, then the president and COO. In April 2016, the company acquired TransFirst for $2.35 billion, making it the 6th largest acquirer in the United States. In June 2016, the company acquired the remaining 45% stake in TSYS Managed Services EMEA from The Merchants Group Limited.

In February 2017, the company's lobbying of the Republican Party was credited for a bill that would remove the Consumer Financial Protection Bureau's limits on overdraft fees. 10-12% of NetSpend's revenue comes from these fees.

In late 2017, the company acquired a former Citigroup card production facility in Columbus, Ohio and invested $25 million to build out a second,  credit card production facility, with a capacity to produce 67 million credit cards per year.

In January 2018, the company acquired Cayan for $1.05 billion. In June 2018, the company acquired Jacksonville, Florida-based iMobile3 for $13.4 million. 

On September 18, 2019, TSYS and Global Payments completed their merger agreement for $21.5 billion. The combined company, Global Payments Inc., is publicly traded (NYSE: GPN), and has more than 24,000 employees worldwide.

References

External links
 ngenuity payments journal

Companies formerly listed on the New York Stock Exchange
American companies established in 1983
Financial services companies established in 1983
Financial services companies of the United States
Payment service providers
Companies based in Columbus, Georgia
Financial technology companies
Corporate spin-offs
1983 establishments in Georgia (U.S. state)
1980s initial public offerings
2019 mergers and acquisitions